The 2022 United Nations Security Council election was held on 9 June 2022 during the 76th session of the United Nations General Assembly, held at United Nations Headquarters in New York City. The elections are for five non-permanent seats on the UN Security Council for two-year mandates commencing on 1 January 2023.
In accordance with the Security Council's rotation rules, whereby the ten non-permanent UNSC seats rotate among the various regional blocs into which UN member states traditionally divide themselves for voting and representation purposes, the five available seats are allocated as follows:

One for Africa
One for the Asia-Pacific Group
One for Latin America and the Caribbean
Two for the Western European and Others Group

The five members will serve on the Security Council for the 2023–24 period.

Candidates

Africa Group

Asia-Pacific Group

Western Europe and Others Group
: Switzerland released a website dedicated to the final phase of its candidature on 30 October 2020

Latin America and the Caribbean

Result

African and Asia-Pacific Groups

Latin American and Caribbean Group

Western European and Others Group

Regarding the election results, 2023 will mark the first time Mozambique and Switzerland has ever held a Security Council seat. In addition, it will be Japan's twelfth time, Ecuador's fourth time, and Malta's second time sitting on the Security Council.

See also
List of members of the United Nations Security Council

References

2022 elections
2022
Non-partisan elections
June 2022 events